Road Kill is the second live album by Swedish metal band The Haunted, released on 21 April 2010. The live tracks were recorded at Melkweg, Amsterdam on 13 February 2009. The studio bonus tracks were recorded during the Versus sessions, 1–14 April 2008

Track listing 
"Little Cage" – 3:05
"The Drowning" – 4:15
"Trespass" – 3:40
"The Premonition" – 0:48
"The Flood" – 3:42
"The Medication" – 4:47
"Moronic Colossus" – 3:45
"D.O.A." – 4:19
"All Against All" – 6:18
"In Vein" – 3:54
"Trenches" – 3:58
"Dark Intentions" – 1:24
"Bury Your Dead" – 3:17
"Faultline" – 3:50
"99" – 4:42
"Hate Song" – 3:19
"Sacrifice" – 4:44* (music: A. Björler / J. Björler)
"Meat Wagon" – 3:05* (music: Dolving)
"Walk on Water" – 3:27* (music: A. Björler)
"Seize the Day" – 2:11* (music: Jensen)
"Infernalis Mundi" – 0:44* (music: Dolving)

* Studio bonus tracks

Credits 
Peter Dolving – vocals
Patrik Jensen – guitars
Anders Björler – guitars
Jonas Björler – bass
Per Möller Jensen – drums

References 

2010 albums
The Haunted (Swedish band) albums